
Gmina Igołomia-Wawrzeńczyce is a rural gmina (administrative district) in Kraków County, Lesser Poland Voivodeship, in southern Poland.

Villages
Gmina Igołomia-Wawrzeńczyce contains the villages and settlements of Dobranowice, Igołomia, Koźlica, Odwiśle, Pobiednik Mały, Pobiednik Wielki, Rudno Górne, Stręgoborzyce, Tropiszów, Wawrzeńczyce, Wygnanów, Złotniki, Zofipole and Żydów.

Neighbouring gminas
Gmina Igołomia-Wawrzeńczyce is bordered by the city of Kraków and by the gminas of Drwinia, Kocmyrzów-Luborzyca, Koniusza, Niepołomice, Nowe Brzesko and Proszowice.

References
Polish official population figures 2006

Igolomia-Wawrzenczyce
Gmina Igolomia Wawrzenczyce